Shallow Inlet is a marine inlet, opening onto Waratah Bay on the western side of the Yanakie Isthmus in South Gippsland, Victoria, south-eastern Australia.  It lies close to the small holiday communities of Sandy Point and Yanakie, as well as to Wilsons Promontory and the Wilsons Promontory National Park.

Description
The inlet is a shallow, curving, 18 km2 tidal embayment with a single channel to the sea.  On the seaward side it is enclosed by a barrier of sandy spits, bars and mobile dunes. The extensive intertidal mudflats and areas of sand provide habitat for waders, or shorebirds.  Fringing the mudflats are areas of saltmarsh.

Birds
The inlet has been identified by BirdLife International as an Important Bird Area (IBA) because it supports over 1% of the world populations of double-banded plovers and red-necked stints, and has supported the critically endangered orange-bellied parrot.  Other birds recorded as using the site in significant numbers include eastern curlews, Pacific golden plovers, curlew sandpipers and sanderlings.

References

Important Bird Areas of Victoria (Australia)
Bays of Victoria (Australia)
Gippsland (region)
Inlets of Australia